Very Mean Men  is a 2000 American crime-comedy film directed by Tony Vitale and starring Matthew Modine, Ben Gazzara, Martin Landau, Scott Baio, Burt Young, and Paul Ben-Victor.

Release
The film entered the competition at the 2000 Seattle International Film Festival, in which it won the New American Cinema Award for best editing.

Cast 
 Matthew Modine as Bartender
 Ben Gazzara as Gino Minetti	
 Martin Landau as Mr. White
 Scott Baio as Paulie Minetti
 Burt Young as Dominic Piazza
 Paul Ben-Victor as Jimmy D.
 Billy Drago as Dante
 Charles Durning as Paddy Mulroney
 Louise Fletcher as Katherine Mulroney
 Jack McGee as Jocko Mulroney
 Patrick Renna as Donny Mulroney
 Idalis DeLeón as Argentine
 Leigh-Allyn Baker as Mary
 Charles Napier as Detective Bailey
 Joe Lara as Detective Miller
 Lana Parrilla as Teresa
 Tony Vitale as Night Bartender

References

External links
 

2000 films
American crime comedy films
2000s crime comedy films
2000 comedy films
2000s English-language films
2000s American films
English-language crime comedy films